Mount Rushmore was an American rock band in the late 1960s from San Francisco, California, United States, that played a heavy blues rock style with psychedelic elements. AllMusic described the outfit as "also-rans of the San Francisco psychedelic era". They were named after the colossal statue in South Dakota, Mount Rushmore.

The band formed in early 1967 at 1915 Oak Street, a large Victorian rooming house in the Haight-Ashbury district. The original members were Ed Levin (ex-Vipers), Warren Phillips (ex Blue House Basement), Thomas Dotzler, Mike Bolan and Danny Wei. Wei was soon replaced by Terry Kimble on bass guitar. In June and July 1967, they were featured on posters for shows at the Avalon Ballroom with many other bands including The Doors, Procol Harum, The Paul Butterfield Blues Band, Grateful Dead, Steve Miller, Santana, Quicksilver Messenger Service, and Big Brother and the Holding Company. In June 1967, Mount Rushmore played two sets at The KFRC Fantasy Fair and Magic Mountain Music Festival; it was just one week before the Monterey Pop Festival, which is considered the world's first "Rock Festival". In March 1968, Dotzler left to join local band Phoenix, and was soon followed by Phillips and Levin. Bolan and Kimble added Glenn Smith and Travis Fullerton to the line up and this line-up made two albums.

Members on the recordings
 Mike Bolan — "Bull" — guitar
 Glenn Smith — "Smitty" — vocals, guitar
 Travis Fullerton — drums, percussion
 Terry Kimble — bass

Warren B. Phillips was the former lead singer of the band, and wrote a few songs that were recorded by the band after he left.

Fullerton and Bolan continued musical careers.  Mike Bolan and Glenn Smith were previously members of The Fabulous Shadows, a band from Coeur d'Alene, Idaho, between 1963 and 1968.  Mike Bolan rejoined them later and they have been performing in Idaho on through 2005.  Terry Kimble (deceased) was a member of the band Tony Vance and The Progress Hornsby 4 from Spokane, Washington, between 1967 and 1968.

Albums

High on Mount Rushmore 

 Produced by Ray Ruff, 1968, DOT Records DLP 25898 (there is a DJ only monophonic pressing, DOT 3898)
 Stone Free (Jimi Hendrix) 3:57
 Without No Smog (Glenn Smith, Mike Bolan) 5:27
 Ocean (Warren B. Phillips) 4:07
 I Don't Believe in Statues (Warren B. Phillips) 4:08
 Looking Back (Glenn Smith, Mike Bolan, T. Fullerton, T. Kimball) 9:40
 ('Cause) She's So Good to Me (Bobby Womack) 3:35
 Medley: 7:23
 Fannie Mae (B. Brown, M. Robinson)
 Dope Song (Glenn Smith)
 Album dedicated to: "The Love Burger Lady of Haight Street" 
This album debuted at number 41 on the Billboard'' national album chart.

Mount Rushmore '69 
 Produced by Ray Ruff, 1969, DOT Records DLP 25934
 It's Just the Way I Feel (Glenn Smith) 4:35
 10:09 Blues (Glenn Smith) 5:53
 Toe Jam (Kimball, Fullerton, Bolan) 5:45
 V-8 Ford Blues (Willie Lowe) 2:35
 Love is the Reason (Dotzler, Phillips, Bolan, Levin, Esterlie) 3:55
 I'm Comin' Home (Glenn Smith, Mike Bolan) 7:35
 King of Earrings (Warren B. Phillips) 4:00
 Somebody's Else's Games (Glenn Smith) 4:35

High On / '69 
In 2002, a European CD was released by Lizard that combined the two albums, with the songs from the 1969 album included first.

Single
 "Stone Free" / "('Cause) She's So Good to Me", 1968, DOT 17158

References

Musical groups from San Francisco
Psychedelic rock music groups from California
Dot Records artists